Jesper Falck (born 4 December 1970) is a retired Danish professional football player and current manager of RB1906, the reserves team of FC Roskilde. Born in Copenhagen, Denmark, he played as a midfielder for a number of Danish clubs, as well as Austrian club SC Bregenz. In Denmark, Falck played for FC Roskilde, Lyngby FC, Akademisk Boldklub (AB), Herfølge BK, and B.93, winning the 1999 Danish Cup with AB. From 1994 to 2004, Falck played a combined 226 games and scored 35 goals in the Danish Superliga championship for Lyngby, AB, and Herfølge.

Falck was part of the Herfølge squad that won the 1999–2000 Danish Superliga.

References

External links
 

1970 births
Akademisk Boldklub players
Boldklubben af 1893 players
Danish expatriate men's footballers
Danish football managers
Danish men's footballers
Expatriate footballers in Austria
Herfølge Boldklub players
Living people
Lyngby Boldklub players
SW Bregenz players
Association football midfielders
Footballers from Copenhagen